Jordan Bos (born 29 October 2002) is an Australian professional footballer who plays as a left back for Melbourne City.

Early life
Bos grew up in the Melbourne suburb of Point Cook and played junior football for Hoppers Crossing SC. He went to secondary school at the Point Cook campus of Emmanuel College.

Club career

Melbourne City
In September 2021, Bos signed his first professional contract with Melbourne City on a three-year deal. Bos made his debut for City on 27 November 2021 as an 81st-minute substitute in a 2–2 draw away at Adelaide.
Bos scored his first professional goal on 6 April 2022, during a 4–0 win over Sydney FC, from a shot outside the box.

References

External links

Living people
Australian soccer players
Association football defenders
Melbourne City FC players
National Premier Leagues players
A-League Men players
2002 births
Soccer players from Melbourne
People from the City of Wyndham